The 1967 Atlantic Coast Conference men's basketball tournament was held in Greensboro, North Carolina, at the Greensboro Coliseum, the first of 22 to be held at that venue, from March 9–11, 1967. North Carolina defeated Duke, 82–73, to win the championship. Larry Miller of North Carolina was named tournament MVP. This was the first ACC Tournament not held at Reynolds Coliseum.

North Carolina defeated all three of their in-state rivals on their way to the tournament championship, beating NC State in the quarterfinal round, Wake Forest in the semifinal, and Duke in the championship game.

Bracket

References

Tournament
ACC men's basketball tournament
Basketball in North Carolina
College sports in North Carolina
Sports competitions in Greensboro, North Carolina
ACC men's basketball tournament